Nicholas Vreeland, also known as Rato Khen Rinpoche, Geshe Thupten Lhundup, is a fully ordained Tibetan Buddhist monk who is the abbot of Rato Dratsang Monastery, a 10th-century Tibetan Buddhist monastery reestablished in India. Vreeland is also a photographer. He is the son of Ambassador Frederick Vreeland and grandson of Diana Vreeland, the fashion editor.

Vreeland spends half of his time in Rato Monastery in India, and the other half in the United States, where he is the Director of Kunkhyab Thardo Ling—The Tibet Center, New York City's oldest Tibetan Buddhist center.

In 2014, a documentary film was released about Vreeland, entitled Monk with a Camera.

History
Vreeland was born in Geneva, Switzerland in 1954. He also lived in Germany, and Morocco before coming to live in the United States at the age of 13 when his father, Frederick Vreeland was assigned to the United States Mission to the United Nations.

Vreeland was sent to Groton School in Massachusetts, where he became interested in photography; he became an apprentice to photographers Irving Penn and Richard Avedon, who both worked for Diana Vreeland, Vogue magazine's editor-in-chief.

in the early 1970s, Vreeland attended The American University of Paris, subsequently receiving his BA in 1975 from New York University Film School, where he studied film.

In 1977, Vreeland began his studies of Buddhism with Khyongla Rato Rinpoche, a Tibetan lama sent to the West in the early 1960s by the 14th Dalai Lama to help introduce Tibetan culture and religion. On a photographic assignment in India in 1979, Vreeland met the Dalai Lama, and was asked to photograph the Dalai Lama's first trip to North America.

In 1985 Vreeland became a monk and joined Rato Monastery in the Mungod Tibetan Settlement in Karnataka, India, when there were only 27 monks there. The monastic population of Rato has since grown to over one hundred. Vreeland was awarded a Geshe degree, equivalent to a PhD, in 1998, and returned to New York to assist his teacher, Khyongla Rinpoche, and to help run Kunkhyab Thardo Ling—the Tibet Center, which Rinpoche founded. He became the director of Tibet Center in 1999. Vreeland also helped raise the funds, in part through offering his photographs for sale, to enable Rato Monastery to build a new monastic campus.

Vreeland has edited two books by the Dalai Lama:
 An Open Heart: Practicing Compassion in Everyday Life, 2005, which was a New York Times bestseller
 A Profound Mind, 2011

In 2012, the Dalai Lama appointed Vreeland abbot of Rato Dratsang, which is one of eleven important Tibetan Government monasteries under his authority. The Dalai Lama explained that Vreeland's "special duty [is] to bridge Tibetan tradition and [the] Western world."

In May 2014, Vreeland was awarded Honorary Doctorate degrees from The American University of Paris and from John Cabot University in Rome.

Documentary film
Monk With A Camera: The Life and Journey of Nicholas Vreeland, is a biographical documentary film about Nicholas Vreeland, directed by Guido Santi and Tina Mascara. The film was released in 2014.

Photography exhibitions
An exhibition of twenty of Vreeland's images has traveled to twelve cities around the world, and has raised funds to enable the rebuilding of Rato Monastery in India.

 "Return to the Roof of the World", Leica Gallery, New York, NY, April 2011; Taipei, Taiwan February 2013. These were photographs taken when Vreeland accompanied Khyongla Rato Rinpoche on his return to the Dagyab district of Tibet.

Bibliography
 An Open Heart: Practicing Compassion in Everyday Life, by H. H. the Dalai Lama (Author), Khyongla Rato (Afterword), Richard Gere (Afterword), Nicholas Vreeland (Editor), Little, Brown and Company, 2001, 
 A Profound Mind: Cultivating Wisdom in Everyday Life,by H. H. the Dalai Lama (Author), Nicholas Vreeland (Editor), Richard Gere (Afterword): Harmony, Random House, 2011,

References

External links
  Vreeland's website: http://nicholasvreeland.com
 The Tibet Center of New York and New Jersey website: http://thetibetcenter.org/schedule/
 Rato Dratsang Foundation website: http://www.ratodratsangfoundation.org/photos_for_rato/index.html

1955 births
Living people
Buddhist abbots
Geshes
Indian Buddhist monks
Groton School alumni
Tibetan Buddhists from India
Gelug Buddhists
American University of Paris alumni
American emigrants to India
American expatriates in India
Tibetan Buddhists from the United States
American Buddhist monks
American people of English descent
American expatriates in Germany
American expatriates in Morocco
New York University alumni
Indian people of English descent
Indian people of American descent
American expatriates in Switzerland
Vreeland family